Stratified epithelium may refer to:
 Stratified columnar epithelium
 Stratified cuboidal epithelium
 Stratified squamous epithelium

See also
 Epithelium